The name Sonca has been used to name four tropical cyclones in the northwestern Pacific Ocean. The name was contributed by Vietnam and means a lark (see ).

 Typhoon Sonca (2005) (T0503, 03W, Bising)
 Typhoon Sonca (2011) (T1116, 19W)
 Tropical Storm Sonca (2017) (T1708, 08W) - impacted Thailand
 Tropical Storm Sonca (2022) (T2219, 22W) – impacted Vietnam

Pacific typhoon set index articles